Ritu Rani (born 29 December 1991) is an Indian field hockey player and former captain of the national team. She plays as a halfback. Rani has led the team to medal winning performances most notably the bronze at the 2014 Asian Games. Also under her captaincy the team qualified for the Olympics after 36 years after finishing fifth in the 2014–15 Women's FIH Hockey World League Semifinals.

Early life and career
Ritu Rani was born on 29 December 1991, in Haryana. She did her schooling at the Sri Guru Nanak Dev Sr. Higher Secondary School in Shahabad Markanda, Haryana. She took to hockey at the age of 9 and trained with the Shahbad Hockey Academy in Shahabad Markanda. Rani was employed with the Indian Railways until 2014, when she quit to join the Haryana Police. Rani trained at the Shahbad Hockey Academy at Shahabad.

Career
Rani made her debut in the senior team in 2006, at the Asian Games in Doha. She was a part of the Indian team that played the 2006 World Cup in Madrid, and aged 14 at the time, she was the youngest in the squad. At the 2009 Champions Challenge II in Kazan, Russia, India won the tournament, with Rani finishing as the top scorer with eight goals to her name. She was appointed the captain of the team in 2011. Led by her, the team finished third at the 2013 Asia Cup in Kuala Lumpur and the 2014 Asian Games in Incheon, South Korea.

During the summer of 2015 when India hosted the Round 2 of the 2014–15 Women's FIH Hockey World League Rani led the team to finish on top to qualify for the next stage. She also led the side at the World League Semifinals held in Antwerp and the team finished in the fifth place beating higher ranked Japan in classification match. The Indian woman's national field hockey team thus qualified for the  
2016 Summer Olympics for the first time since the 1980 Summer Olympics under her captaincy.

On qualifying for the 2016 Summer Olympics Rani said:

Awards, rewards and recognition
 Arjuna Award - 2016

References

External links
 

1991 births
Living people
Indian female field hockey players
21st-century Indian women
21st-century Indian people
Asian Games medalists in field hockey
Asian Games bronze medalists for India
Field hockey players at the 2006 Asian Games
Field hockey players at the 2010 Asian Games
Field hockey players at the 2014 Asian Games
Field hockey players from Haryana
Medalists at the 2006 Asian Games
Medalists at the 2014 Asian Games
Sportswomen from Haryana
Recipients of the Arjuna Award
South Asian Games gold medalists for India
South Asian Games medalists in field hockey
Field hockey players at the 2010 Commonwealth Games
Field hockey players at the 2014 Commonwealth Games
Commonwealth Games competitors for India